Mühlenpfordt is a German surname. Notable people with the surname include:

Justus Mühlenpfordt (1911–2000), German nuclear physicist
Philipp August Friedrich Mühlenpfordt (1803–1891), German botanist

German-language surnames